Abshir Aden Ferro is a candidate for the 2021 presidential race in Somalia. His political platform is largely focused on establishing democratic elections and preventing the Al-Shabaab militant group from controlling the Somali government. Ferro was born in Somalia in 1968. He moved to France at age twelve, where he became an entrepreneur and started several businesses.

Early life and education
Ferro was born in 1968 in Somalia. His father was a former Somali deputy. Ferro is also related to former president Mohamed Siad Barre, model Iman Bowie, and other politicians. As a child, he attended school in Mogadishu and was taught from the Quran. He also studied with nuns from Italy, until he moved to France at age twelve to be with his father and stepmother. He spent a year back in Somali in language studies, before settling in London around age 21 for about 30 years.

Business and politics
While in London, Ferro married and founded an international security company called Fort Roche. He also owns the companies Abshir Advisors and Somsec. At first, he got involved in international politics by collaborating with  the British Ministry of Foreign Affairs, the United Nations' anti-piracy efforts, and others. He created the Somalian Alliance for the Future Party in 2019 and ran for the Presidency of Somalia under that party in 2021, despite multiple attempts to assassinate him.

Ferro's presidential campaign focuses on universal suffrage, removing the militant group, Al-Shabaab, and reducing corruption in the use of international aid. In Somalia, tribal leaders appoint deputies that vote for government appointees. The country has not had universal suffrage since 1969.

Personal life
Ferro travels frequently between London, Dubai and Mogadishu. He is a dual French and Somali citizen.

References

External links
 Official website
 Interview with Ferro in L'Afrique
 Interview in Marianne
 Interview in Technikart

1968 births
Living people
Somalian politicians
Presidential candidates